Bionix may refer to:

 Bionix (TV programming block), a program block on the Canadian channel YTV

 Air Creation BioniX, a French ultralight trike wing design
 AOI: Bionix, a 2001 album by De La Soul, and its title song
 Bionix AFV, a family of Singaporean armoured fighting vehicles
 The Bionix, a Belgian music production team; see 2014 album Aznavour, sa jeunesse

See also
 BionX, a Canadian e-bike electric assist motor manufacturer